Piedras Blancas State Marine Reserve (SMR) and Piedras Blancas State Marine Conservation Area (SMCA) are two adjoining marine protected areas that lie offshore of San Luis Obispo County on California’s central coast. The SMR protects all marine life within its boundaries. Fishing and take of all living marine resources is prohibited. Within the SMCA fishing and take of all living marine resources is prohibited except the commercial and recreational take of salmon and albacore.

History
Piedras Blancas SMR and Piedras Blancas SMCA were established in September 2007 by the California Department of Fish & Game. They are two of 29 marine protected areas adopted during the first phase of the Marine Life Protection Act Initiative. The Marine Life Protection Act Initiative (or MLPAI) is a collaborative public process to create a statewide network of marine protected areas along the California coastline.

Geography and natural features
These two marine protected areas adjoin each other off the coast of San Luis Obispo County.

The Piedras Blancas SMR is bounded by the mean high tide line and straight lines connecting the following points in the order listed:

35° 42.85’ N. lat. 121° 18.95’ W. long.;

35° 42.85’ N. lat. 121° 21.00’ W. long.;

35° 39.15’ N. lat. 121° 18.50’ W. long.; and

35° 39.15’ N. lat. 121° 14.45’ W. long.

The Piedras Blancas SMCA is bounded by the mean high tide line and straight lines connecting the following points in the order listed except where noted:

35° 42.85’ N. lat. 121° 21.00’ W. long.;

35° 42.85’ N. lat. 121° 22.85’ W. long.; thence southward along the

three nautical mile offshore boundary to

35° 39.15’ N. lat. 121° 20.90’ W. long.;

35° 39.15’ N. lat. 121° 18.50’ W. long.; and

35° 42.85’ N. lat. 121° 21.00’ W. long.

Habitat and wildlife
The Piedras Blancas marine protected areas encompass a rich nearshore, including extensive tidepools, two species of kelp, and both sandy and cobble beaches. Offshore, a high relief deepwater rocky structure attracts large forage fish populations and provides shelter for rockfish. These habitats support a particularly high diversity of birds and marine mammals including California sea lions, elephant seals, harbor seals, northern fur seals and sea otters. Historically this area was one of the most productive abalone beds in California. Many migratory whales most notably gray whales pass and rest through the area in annual seasons, and there had been a sighting of a North Pacific right whale, the most rare of large whales in the world in 1995.

Recreation and nearby attractions
Hearst Castle, former home of William Randolph Hearst, is at nearby Hearst San Simeon State Historic Monument and offers visitor tours.

The Piedras Blancas Light Station is an Outstanding Natural Area, managed by the Bureau of Land Management.  The lighthouse was built in 1875 and a Victorian dwelling was later completed.  Tours are offered to the public.

Piedreas Blancas is home to an important elephant seal rookery. Friends of the Elephant Seal is a non-profit organization dedicated to educating people about elephant seals and other marine life.

California’s marine protected areas encourage recreational and educational uses of the ocean.  Activities such as kayaking, diving, snorkeling, and swimming are allowed unless otherwise restricted.

Scientific monitoring
As specified by the Marine Life Protection Act, select marine protected areas along California’s central coast are being monitored by scientists to track their effectiveness and learn more about ocean health. Similar studies in marine protected areas located off of the Santa Barbara Channel Islands have already detected gradual improvements in fish size and number.

Local scientific and educational institutions involved in the monitoring include Stanford University’s Hopkins Marine Station, University of California Santa Cruz, Moss Landing Marine Laboratories and Cal Poly San Luis Obispo. Research methods include hook-and-line sampling, intertidal and scuba diver surveys, and the use of Remote Operated Vehicle (ROV) submarines.

References

External links
California MPAs
Marine Life Protection Act Initiative
CalOceans
Hearst San Simeon State Historic Monument
Piedras Blancas Light Station
Friends of the Elephant Seal

Marine reserves of the United States
Protected areas established in 2007
2007 establishments in California